The 1986 ICF World Junior Canoe Slalom Championships were the inaugural edition of the ICF World Junior Canoe Slalom Championships. The event took place in Spittal an der Drau, Austria from 16 to 20 July 1986 under the auspices of the International Canoe Federation (ICF).

Three medal events took place. No C2 event or team events were held.

Medal summary

Men

Canoe

Kayak

Women

Kayak

Medal table

References

External links
International Canoe Federation

ICF World Junior Canoe Slalom Championships
ICF World Junior and U23 Canoe Slalom Championships